"Addiction" is a song by the band Skinny Puppy, taken from their 1987 album Cleanse Fold and Manipulate.  It was released on vinyl in 1987 and released on CD in 1991 (Canada) and 1997 (United States). The lyrics of the song quote the 19th century Gothic novel Melmoth the Wanderer by Charles Maturin.

Track listing

Personnel
Nivek Ogre
cEvin Key
Dwayne Goettel

Other
Addition production on track 1 by Greg Reely, with additional engineering by Adrian Sherwood. Edited by Greg Reely.
Additional production and engineering on track 2-3 by Adrian Sherwood. Assisted by Steve Spapperi. Edited by Adrian Sherwood.
Recorded at Mushroom and Chicago Trax. Mastered by Pete Norman.

Notes
Engineered by cEvin Key and Dave Ogilvie.
Sleeve photography, typography and design by Steven R. Gilmore.

References

External links

Single
Addiction at Discogs (Vinyl, 12", Nettwerk) 
Addiction at Discogs (Vinyl, 12", Nettwerk)
Addiction at Discogs (CD, Maxi-Single, Nettwerk)

1987 singles
Skinny Puppy songs
Nettwerk Records singles
Capitol Records singles
EMI Records singles
1987 songs
Songs written by cEvin Key
Songs written by Dwayne Goettel
Songs written by Nivek Ogre